Chris Foy may refer to:

Chris Foy (actor) (born 1983), Australian actor
Chris Foy (referee) (born 1962),  English football referee